Synodontis serpentis, the Tana squeaker, is a species of upside-down catfish endemic to Kenya where it is found in the Athi and Tana River systems.  This species grows to a length of  TL.

References

External links 

serpentis
Fish described in 1962
Endemic freshwater fish of Kenya